Nevin Spence (26 April 199015 September 2012) was a Northern Ireland-born Irish rugby union player for Ulster in the Pro12. He played as a Centre, but could also play Wing. He was educated firstly at Dromore High School, where he was introduced to rugby, and then at Wallace High School. He played his club rugby with Ballynahinch. He was also a capable footballer, playing for the Northern Ireland U-16's.

Club career
Nevin rose to prominence at Ballynahinch during the hugely successful 2009/10 season. The club won the Ulster Senior League, Cup, AIL Division 2 and All-Ireland Cup all in a single season. Nevin was also a member of the Ulster Rugby Academy.

Spence first tasted professional rugby against the Ospreys in April 2010. In the little more than two seasons that he played for Ulster he made 42 appearances, despite suffering a number of shoulder injuries, and scored five tries.

International career
He made 11 appearances for the Ireland national under-20 rugby union team, scoring four tries, and played twice at the IRB Junior World Championships. After some strong performances for Ulster and two appearances for Ireland Wolfhounds, he was called up to Ireland's senior training squad for the 2011 Six Nations Championship. His talent was recognised by his fellow professionals in 2011 when he was named Young Player of the Year at the IRUPA Players' Awards. In May 2012 he played for Ireland against the Barbarians in a non-capped game played at Gloucester's Kingsholm Stadium.

Death
Spence died, along with his brother Graham and father Noel, in an accident at the family farm in Hillsborough, County Down on 15 September 2012, where they were overcome by fumes in a slurry tank. Spence's sister was treated in hospital and survived the accident.

They were buried in Inch cemetery, following a joint funeral which was held at the Ballynahinch Baptist Church. As a mark of respect for Spence, a minute's silence was observed at many rugby games in Britain and Ireland the following week. A memorial service was held at Ravenhill Stadium, the home ground of Ulster Rugby, on Sunday 23 September 2012.

References

External links
Ulster Profile
Ireland Wolfhounds Profile

1990 births
2012 deaths
Accidental deaths in Northern Ireland
Baptists from Northern Ireland
Rugby union centres
Rugby union wings
People educated at Wallace High School, Lisburn
People from County Down
Ulster Rugby players
20th-century Baptists
Rugby union players from County Down
Irish rugby union players